Pombola is free open source software by mySociety for running a parliamentary monitoring website.

Pombola's development was funded by the Omidyar Network to relaunch the Mzalendo site in Kenya.

The IndigoTrust funded roll-out to further countries, with a particular focus on the provision of transparency websites for sub-Saharan Africa.

Among other features, Pombola allows for websites that publish parliamentary transcripts, hold a database of information about politicians, and, using the mySociety software MapIt, can match a user's home location to their constituency.

The site was inspired by TheyWorkForYou – mySociety's UK parliamentary monitoring site.

Sites running on Pombola 
 Ghana – Odekro
 Kenya – Mzalendo
 Nigeria – Shine Your Eye
 South Africa – People's Assembly
 Zimbabwe – Kuvakazim

References

External links 
 MySociety: Pombola

MySociety
Software using the GNU AGPL license
Open government
2013 software